Thomas Maurice Rice (born 26 January 1939 in Dundalk, Ireland; known professionally as Maurice Rice) is an Irish (and naturalised American) theoretical physicist specializing in condensed matter physics.

Life
Rice is the younger brother of structural engineer Peter Rice. He grew up in 52 Castle Road, Dundalk in County Louth with his two siblings. Like his brother, he studied at the local Christian Brothers school. Subsequently he studied physics as an undergraduate at University College Dublin and as a graduate student with Volker Heine at the University of Cambridge. In 1964, he moved to the US and spent two years as a post-doc with Walter Kohn at the University of California, San Diego. Then he joined the technical staff at Bell Labs in 1966, where he stayed until 1981, when he joined the Institute for Theoretical Physics at the Eidgenössische Technische Hochschule (ETH) in Zurich, Switzerland.

Rice and his wife, Helen, moved with their family of a son and two daughters from New Jersey to Zurich. Rice retired from teaching in 2004 and is an Emeritus Professor at ETH.

Career
Rice graduated at a time when the field of condensed matter physics expanded from the study of just simple metals and semiconductors to cover a broad range of compound materials. This led him to collaborate with both theorist and experimentalist colleagues to interpret novel electronic properties of these materials. Bell Labs in the 1960s and 1970s provided the ideal environment for such collaborations. Rice's contributions covered a range of topics and materials, including metal-insulators transitions in transition metal oxides, electron-hole liquids in optically pumped semiconductors and charge and spin density waves.

In the early 1980s, Rice moved to ETH, a few years before Georg Bednorz and K. Alex Müller at the nearby IBM laboratories, made their discovery of high temperature superconductivity in layered cuprate compounds. Rice quickly switched his research to the challenges and puzzles posed by these novel and exceptional superconductors. Cuprates rapidly became a major topic in condensed matter physics, as a large range of spectacular properties in addition to high temperature superconductivity were discovered. Rice and his collaborators concentrated on developing a consistent microscopic interpretation of the various novel experimental results. The biggest challenge is the microscopic description of the mysterious pseudogap phase, which appears in a range of intermediate hole doping. Together with a series of talented graduate students and postdocs, he has focused on the role of enhanced Umklapp scattering in a nearly half-filled band as the key to the unexpected features. The physics of cuprates, even after three decades of research, remains very active with many open and controversial questions.

Achievement on the mechanism of superconductivity
[Problem] As for the mechanism of superconductivity, R. N. Cooper, one of the authors of  BCS theory  proposed a concept of an electron pair (called the Cooper pair) as a carrier of superconductivity in 1956. The Cooper pair is formed by phonon-mediated pairing of two electrons at the outside of the Fermi sea corresponding to the Fermi energy. However, he did not specify theoretically how to excite the two electrons to the outside of the Fermi sea. This leaded to the absence of the Cooper pair in the BCS theory. In fact, it was well known that the BCS theory cannot explain the Meissner effect and critical temperatures of superconductivity, such as low temperature superconductivity in metal elements and their alloys, high-temperature superconductivity in cuprates and iron-based materials, and near room-temperature superconductivity of Hydride materials. Moreover, the mechanism of the superconductivity has been unsolved over 110 years since the discovery of superconductivity by Kamerlingh Onnes in 1911.

[Contribution] As of the problem on ‘the excitation of two electrons to the outside of the Fermi sea’, T. M. Rice and W. F. Brinkman theoretically discovered a discontinuity, the inverse of renormalized mass, m*, of carrier (dBR=m/m*=1-(U/Uc)2; m* has a divergence near U/Uc=1), at the Fermi energy under the condition of one electron per atom from the general solution calculated by Gutzwiller's variational method in a correlated metal with only the on-site electron-electron Coulomb interaction U . The discontinuity decreases as U increases, but does not absolutely become zero.

In terms of the BCS mechanism of superconductivity, the physical meaning of the discontinuity indicates that the number of electrons at the outside of the Fermi energy increases as U increases, which is interpreted as the mechanism for exciting two electrons outside the Fermi surface (sea) and thereby to the formation of Cooper pairs. That is, near the critical Coulomb interaction Uc, the number of Cooper pairs is maximum. Therefore, the unresolved problem, the presence of two electrons at the outside of the Fermi energy, is explained. Moreover, the Cooper-pair concept of Cooper appeared in 1957, but Brinkman-Rice's work was announced in 1970; there was a time interval.

[Conclusion] Based on combining the BCS theory and the Brinkman-Rice work, the mechanism of superconductivity may be naturally explained. Finally, Rice and Brinkman's work, the theoretical discovery of the discontinuity, decisively contributed to revealing the mechanism of superconductivity through forming of Cooper pair.

Awards and honours

 D.Sc (h.c.) National University of Ireland (1989)
 Honorary Member, Royal Irish Academy (1988)
 Member, National Academy of Sciences (1993)
 Fellow of The Royal Society (2002)
 EPS Europhysics Prize (1998)
 John Bardeen Prize for Superconductivity Theory (2000)

Selected papers
The following papers are Rice's most cited:

References

1939 births
Living people
People from Dundalk
Members of the United States National Academy of Sciences
Fellows of the Royal Society
Members of the Royal Irish Academy
Irish emigrants to the United States
Irish expatriates in Switzerland
American expatriate academics
American expatriates in Switzerland
Alumni of the University of Cambridge
Alumni of University College Dublin
Academic staff of ETH Zurich
Scientists at Bell Labs